The Chicken House is a publishing company owned by Scholastic Corporation, specialising in children's fiction.

Founded in 2000 by Barry Cunningham and Rachel Hickman as Chicken House Publishing, it was bought by Scholastic in 2005. It has introduced many new successful authors, including Cornelia Funke, Roderick Gordon and Brian Williams, Kevin Brooks, Lucy Christopher, Rachel Ward, M. G. Leonard, Rachel Grinti, Kiran Millwood Hargrave and Jasbinder Bilan. It is the UK publisher of the multi-million bestselling Maze Runner series.

The Times/Chicken House Children’s Fiction Competition

The Times/Chicken House Children's Fiction Competition was launched in 2008 by Chicken House and The Times newspaper.

The annual competition is for full manuscripts suitable for readers aged between 7 and 18 by unpublished, unagented writers. The grand prize is a publishing contract worth £10,000. In 2019 a second prize was introduced to mark the competition's tenth anniversary, with a publishing contract worth £7,500 awarded to the Chairman's Choice.
Terms and Conditions can be found on the Chicken House website.

Winners of the Competition in Chronological Order
 2008: Emily Diamand, Flood Child
 2009: Sophia Bennett, Threads 
 2010: Janet Foxley, Muncle Trogg 
 2011: Kieran Larwood, Freaks 
 2012: Fletcher Moss, Poison Boy
 2013: Wendy Constance, Brave 
 2014: Kerr Thomson, The Sound of Whales 
 2015: Laurel Remington, The Secret Cooking Club
 2016: Nicki Thornton, The Last Chance Hotel
 2017: Jasbinder Bilan, Asha & the Spirit Bird
 2018: Trudi Tweedie, The Pure Heart
 2019: Efua Traoré, Children of the Quicksands
 2019: Richard Pickard, The Peculiar Tale of the Tentacle Boy (Chairman's Choice)
 2020: Varsha Shah, Adjay and the Mumbai Rail Times
 2020: Fran Hart, The Other Ones (Chairman's Choice)
 2021: Emily Randall, The Flood Child
 2021: Alison Stegert, The Remarkables (IET 150 Award)

See also
 Scholastic Corporation

References

External links
 
 Times/Chicken House Children's Fiction Competition information page

Children's book publishers
Publishing companies established in 2000
Book publishing companies of the United Kingdom
Scholastic Corporation